Milwaukee Mustangs refers to:

 Milwaukee Mustangs (1994–2001),  a professional arena football team formerly in the Arena Football League
 Milwaukee Mustangs (2009–12), a professional arena football team formerly in the af2 and Arena Football League